Loma Alto de la Bandera is a mountain in the Dominican Republic located within Valle Nuevo National Park, which is in the province of La Vega Province. During the United States occupation of the Dominican Republic (1916–24), the mountain was mapped, catalogued, and measured to a height of 9324 ft. (2842 m), with a prominence of 4961 ft. (1512m). Due to the peak's relative proximity to Santo Domingo, the mountaintop is coated with telecommunications towers, including those used for air traffic control at Las Américas International Airport.

References

Mountains of the Dominican Republic